Mueang Chum is a village and tambon (subdistrict) of Wiang Chai District, in Chiang Rai Province, Thailand. In 2005, it had a population of 7,274  people. The tambon contains 11 villages.

References

Tambon of Chiang Rai province
Populated places in Chiang Rai province